is a small, uninhabited island within the Geiyo Islands of the Japanese Inland Sea. Administratively, it forms part of the city of Imabari, Ehime Prefecture. In the late mediaeval period, the island was occupied by Noshima Castle and, together with the surrounding area, was the base of the Noshima Murakami, one of the three main houses of the Murakami kaizoku. In his Historia de Iapam, Luís Fróis described Noximadono (i.e., the lord of Noshima) as o mayor corsario de todo Japaõ, "the greatest corsair in all Japan". The island castle, together with tiny Taizakijima immediately to the south, has been designated a National Historic Site, and is an element of Japan Heritage "Story" #036, while Noshima is also afforded protection as a Class I Special Zone within Setonaikai National Park.

See also

 Setonaikai National Park
 List of Historic Sites of Japan (Ehime)
 Kurushima
 Innoshima

References

External links
  Detailed maps of Setonaikai National Park (Ministry of the Environment; Noshima is in 愛媛県地域（今治北）)

Imabari, Ehime
Islands of the Seto Inland Sea
Islands of Ehime Prefecture
Uninhabited islands of Japan